Limington, also archaeically Lymington, is a village and former civil parish, now in the parish of Yeovilton and District, in Somerset, England, situated  north of Yeovil in the South Somerset district. The parish has a population of 199. The parish included the hamlet of Draycott.

It lies near the left bank of the River Yeo opposite Yeovilton.

History

The name of the village means settlement on a stream from Lymn a Celtic word for stream or river.

Before the Norman Conquest the manor was held by Glastonbury Abbey. It then passed to the Courcelles family. The parish of Limington was part of the Stone Hundred.

William Rosewell purchased the manor in 1564 and it was inherited by subsequent generations: William Rosewell of Forde Abbey (1563-1593); Sir Henry Rosewell (1593-1656); and Dame Dorothy Rosewell (1656-1663). Dorothy Rosewell was forced by act of Parliament to sell Limington manor in 1663. The manor was then purchased by James Tazewell who re-built the manor house in 1672. He died in 1683 leaving the manor to his eldest son, James. In 1689 James Tazewell sold it to Virtue Radford and Edward Allen.

Governance

The parish council has responsibility for local issues, including setting an annual precept (local rate) to cover the council's operating costs and producing annual accounts for public scrutiny. The parish council evaluates local planning applications and works with the local police, district council officers, and neighbourhood watch groups on matters of crime, security, and traffic. The parish council's role also includes initiating projects for the maintenance and repair of parish facilities, as well as consulting with the district council on the maintenance, repair, and improvement of highways, drainage, footpaths, public transport, and street cleaning. Conservation matters (including trees and listed buildings) and environmental issues are also the responsibility of the council.

The village falls within the Non-metropolitan district of South Somerset, which was formed on 1 April 1974 under the Local Government Act 1972, having previously been part of Yeovil Rural District. The district council is responsible for local planning and building control, local roads, council housing, environmental health, markets and fairs, refuse collection and recycling, cemeteries and crematoria, leisure services, parks, and tourism.

Somerset County Council is responsible for running the largest and most expensive local services such as education, social services, libraries, main roads, public transport, policing and fire services, trading standards, waste disposal and strategic planning.

It is also part of the Yeovil county constituency represented in the House of Commons of the Parliament of the United Kingdom. It elects one Member of Parliament (MP) by the first past the post system of election.

On 1 March 2022 the parish was merged with Yeovilton to form "Yeovilton and District".

Religious sites

The Anglican Church of St Mary dates from the late 14th century and includes fragments of an earlier building. It has been designated as a Grade I listed building.

Thomas Wolsey was the vicar of the parish before becoming a cardinal of the Roman Catholic Church and Lord Chancellor to Henry VIII.

References

Villages in South Somerset
Former civil parishes in Somerset